Sir William Lucius Selfe (11 June 1845 – 19 March 1924) was a British judge.

He was born in London, the son of Henry Selfe, a metropolitan police magistrate. He was educated at Rugby School and graduated BA from Corpus Christi College, Oxford in 1868. He studied law at the Inner Temple and was called to the bar in 1870.

He became a circuit judge of the county courts in 1882, and Justice of the Peace for Breconshire. He was assistant editor of revised edition of the statutes (1870–78) and editor of Chronological Table and Index to Statutes (1877–82).

He was knighted in the 1897 Diamond Jubilee Honours.

In 1876, he married Ellen, the daughter of Henry Sanford Bicknell of Clapham Common. He died at his residence at Connaught Square, aged 78.

References 

1845 births
1924 deaths
People educated at Rugby School
Alumni of Corpus Christi College, Oxford
20th-century English judges
Legal writers
Knights Bachelor
Welsh justices of the peace
British barristers
County Court judges (England and Wales)